Heptathrips is a genus of thrips in the family Phlaeothripidae.

Species
 Heptathrips africanus
 Heptathrips cottieri
 Heptathrips cumberi
 Heptathrips kuscheli
 Heptathrips magnifica
 Heptathrips ruficaudis
 Heptathrips tillyardi
 Heptathrips tonnoiri

References

Phlaeothripidae
Thrips
Thrips genera